Mie 3rd district (三重県第3区, Mie-ken dai-san-ku or simply 三重3区, Mie-san-ku) is a single-member constituency of the House of Representatives in the Diet of Japan. It covers Northern parts of Mie, namely parts of Yokkaichi, the cities of Kuwana and Inabe and the counties of Kuwana, Inabe and Mie. As of 2012, 339,451 eligible voters were registered in the district.

The only representative for the 3rd district since its creation has been Katsuya Okada who had represented the pre-reform Mie 1st district that had elected five representatives by single non-transferable vote and covered roughly the present single-member districts Mie 1, 2 and 3. Okada was the president of the DPJ from 2004 to 2005.

List of representatives

Election results

References 

Mie Prefecture
Districts of the House of Representatives (Japan)